Sarah Wilkinson is the former chief executive of NHS Digital, which is an executive non-departmental public body of the Department of Health and Social Care, and part of the NHS in England.

Wilkinson has been named as the second most influential woman working in technology in the UK by Computer Weekly, as well as being named as Chief Digital Officer of the year for 2017 by the CDO club.  On her appointment to NHS Digital, she also made her first entry in the Health Service Journal HSJ100 list, entering at number 80. Wilkinson resigned from her role as NHS Digital chief executive in March 2021.

Work history
Before joining NHS Digital, Wilkinson worked as Chief Information Officer at the Home Office.

Prior to this, she held various roles with financial organisations including Credit Suisse, UBS, Deutsche Bank, and Lehman Brothers.

In March 2021, Wilkinson announced her resignation from NHS Digital as Chief Executive Officer after four years of service. An interim CEO is being sought, with permanent recruitment into the role planned for later in the year.

References 

Living people
Alumni of Imperial College London
Alumni of London Business School
Chief Executives of the National Health Service
English healthcare chief executives
Year of birth missing (living people)